Magical Melons (also published as Caddie Woodlawn's Family) is a children's historical novel by Carol Ryrie Brink, first published in 1939. It is the sequel to the Newbery-Award-winning novel Caddie Woodlawn.

Plot 
Set between 1863 and 1866, Magical Melons takes the form of a collection of stories about the Woodlawn family, with many stories overlapping chronologically with the first book.

References

1939 American novels
American children's novels
Children's historical novels
Novels set in the 1860s
Novels set in Wisconsin
1939 children's books